Libera is a surname of Latin origin.

Notable people with the surname include:

Adalberto Libera, Italian architect
Antoni Libera, Polish writer and director
Beata Małecka-Libera, Polish politician
Elena Libera, Italian fencer
Giacomo Libera, Italian footballer
Luca Dalla Libera, Italian canoeist
Piotr Libera, Polish bishop
Zbigniew Libera, Polish artist

See also
 Libera (disambiguation)